Luis Gallo Porras (9 November 1894 – 22 June 1972), was a Peruvian politician from the early 1930s to the late 1950s. He was the mayor of Lima three times, first from 1934 to 1937, second from 1941 to 1945, and third from 1948 to 1949. From 1958 to 1959 he served as Prime Minister of Peru under Manuel Prado Ugarteche. He was minister of economy and finance from 1958 to 1959.
 He served as the first vice president from 1956 to 1962. He was President of the National Club from 1946 to 1948.

References

Prime Ministers of Peru
Vice presidents of Peru
Peruvian Ministers of Economy and Finance
Mayors of Lima
People from Lima
1894 births
1972 deaths